Lissus or Lissos could be:

 Lissus (Crete), an ancient Greek city in Crete
 Lissos (Illyria), an ancient city in Illyria, the present day city of Lezhë in Albania
 Lissus, a river in Thrace